Girls Got Rhythm! is a compilation album featuring various all-female tribute bands. The album is named after the song of the same title by AC/DC.

Track listing
 "Thunderstruck" – ThundHerStruck (AC/DC Tribute)
 "Run to the Hills" - The Iron Maidens (Iron Maiden Tribute)
 "Fairies Wear Boots" - Mistress of Reality (Black Sabbath Tribute)
 "Surrender" - Cheap Chick (Cheap Trick Tribute)
 "Love Gun" - Black Diamond (KISS Tribute)
 "Last Caress" - Ms. Fits (Misfits tribute)
 "Back in Black" - Hell's Belles (AC/DC Tribute)
 "I Don't Know" – The Little Dolls (Ozzy Osbourne Tribute)
 "The Lemon Song" – Zepparella (Led Zeppelin Tribute)
 "Lick It Up" – Kissexy (KISS Tribute)
 "Dog Eat Dog" - Whole Lotta Rosies (AC/DC Tribute)
 "Sheena Is a Punk Rocker" - The Ramonas (Ramones Tribute)
 "Foxy Lady" - Foxey Lady (Jimi Hendrix Tribute)

References

External links 
Liquor & Poker Records Official Site
Girls Got Rhythm! - All Access Magazine Album Review

Tribute albums
2006 compilation albums
All-female tribute bands